Country Time is a brand of non-carbonated lemon-flavored drink mix and soft drink. The powdered mix is produced by Kraft Foods.

History
Country Time lemonade flavor drink mix was introduced in 1975 by General Foods.  Over the years various other flavors, including pink, raspberry, and strawberry lemonade, were added. In 1981 A&W acquired a license to make the bottled and canned ready to drink product from then-owner General Foods.  In 1989, General Foods merged with Kraft Foods, putting the brand under the ownership of Kraft, which still owns it to this day.

Country Time has sponsored NASCAR cars since 1989 when Michael Waltrip drove the car, posting a top 5 finish in it. Possibly the most notable driver was Neil Bonnett driving the Country Time sponsored car for the 1994 Daytona 500, the same race he died in a crash practicing for.

Country Time Lite Lemonade and Lite Pink Lemonade were introduced in 2007 with half the sugar of regular Country Time (advertised as 35 calories per serving).

In April 2012, Sodastream added several Country Time flavors to its line of Sodamix syrups for the company's line of home soda makers.

See also
 List of lemonade topics

References

External links 
 

Products introduced in 1975
Kraft Foods brands
Lemonade
Powdered drink mixes